Albert Conrad De Vito, O.F.M. Cap., an Italian Capuchin, was a prominent Roman Catholic (Latin Rite) clergyman in India who was installed as the first Bishop of Lucknow in December 1946.

Birth
He was born in Provvidenti in 1904 to Raffaele and Maria Felice Cinelli.

In Lucknow
On 20 January 1942, he was appointed the Parish Priest of St. Joseph’s Church of Lucknow. He was appointed first Bishop of the new Diocese of Lucknow on 12 December 1946. he was consecrated on 16 February 1947, the governor of U.P., Sir Francis Wylie extended full support and also attended the consecration and played an important role in the festivities that followed. He remained Bishop of Lucknow until 16 November 1970.

Social service
In early 1950, Bishop Conrad expressed deep concern for primary education. He founded Anand Bhawan School and Institute of the Maids of the Poor in Barabanki city. He also founded following:
 4 orphanages
 38 schools of every kind
 3 hospitals
 a university
 about 20 clinics
 gave go-ahead for the construction of the St. Joseph's Cathedral, Lucknow
When he came back to Bologna he founded the Casa della formazione for young people who didn’t have a stable future. Many Indian Schools are established in his name as "Bishop Conrad School". One of this school is in Bareilly as well.

Death
He died in 1970 in Bologna. Seven years after his death, Indira Gandhi, the then Prime Minister of India, requested and obtained permission for his remains to be laid to rest in the Cathedral of St. Joseph at Lucknow which he himself had promoted.

Books
He wrote the following books:
 Pope Paul VI: glimpses of his life before he became Pope
 Art at the service of faith: art, painting, architecture, symbols, local customs, music, and dance at the service of the church, as visualized by the Fathers of the II Vatican Ecumenical Council outside the Council Hall
 The Second Vatican Council at a Glance: Summary of the Documents of the Second Vatican Council
 Spiritual Life Made Easy
 Pastoral Hints

References

20th-century Roman Catholic bishops in India
1904 births
1970 deaths
Capuchins
Capuchin bishops